Sidney James Montford Atkinson (14 March 1901 – 31 August 1977) was a South African athlete, winner of 110 m hurdles at the 1928 Summer Olympics.

Atkinson came onto the international athletics scene in 1922, when he ran the 110 m hurdles in 15.2 and the 400 m hurdles in 56.5. He was also a notable long jumper.

At the 1924 Summer Olympics, the favourite for the 110 m hurdles was American George Guthrie, but as the race started, Atkinson and another American Daniel Kinsey got off to a quick start and ran nearly together until the eighth flight when Atkinson edged ahead. Atkinson clipped his toe on the last barrier, giving Kinsey enough of lead to break the tape and win the gold. Guthrie crashed through the barriers behind the two medalists and was disqualified.

Atkinson reappeared at the next Olympics, finally getting his gold after the disappointment of 1924, beating the world record holder Steve Anderson from the United States into second place.

References

1901 births
1977 deaths
Sportspeople from Durban
Colony of Natal people
South African male hurdlers
Athletes (track and field) at the 1924 Summer Olympics
Athletes (track and field) at the 1928 Summer Olympics
Olympic gold medalists for South Africa
Olympic silver medalists for South Africa
Olympic athletes of South Africa
South African male long jumpers
Medalists at the 1924 Summer Olympics
Medalists at the 1928 Summer Olympics
Olympic gold medalists in athletics (track and field)
Olympic silver medalists in athletics (track and field)
20th-century South African people